Phillip Bladh was born in Hacienda Heights, California and went to Los Altos High School.  He is an American sound engineer. He won an Academy Award in the category Best Sound for the film Sound of Metal.

Selected filmography 
 Sound of Metal (2020; co-won with Nicolas Becker, Jaime Baksht, Michelle Couttolenc and Carlos Cortés Navarrete)

References

External links 

Living people
Place of birth missing (living people)
Year of birth missing (living people)
American audio engineers
Best Sound Mixing Academy Award winners
21st-century American engineers